Richard Bruton (born 15 March 1953) is an Irish Fine Gael politician who has served as a Teachta Dála (TD) for Dublin Bay North since 2016, and previously from 1982 to 2016 for the Dublin North-Central constituency. He is the Chairman of the Fine Gael Parliamentary Party since July 2020. He previously served as Minister for Communications, Climate Action and Environment from 2018 to 2020, Minister for Education and Skills from 2016 to 2018, Minister for Jobs, Enterprise and Innovation from 2011 to 2016, Deputy Leader of Fine Gael from 2002 to 2010, Minister for Enterprise and Employment from 1994 to 1997 and Minister of State for Energy Affairs from 1986 to 1987. He was a Senator for the Agricultural Panel from 1981 to 1982.

Early and private life
Bruton was born in Dublin in 1953, but grew up in Dunboyne, County Meath. He is a son of Joseph and Doris Bruton. He was educated at Belvedere College, Clongowes Wood College, University College Dublin and Nuffield College, Oxford. At Oxford, he graduated with a MPhil in Economics, his thesis being on the subject of Irish public debt. He is a research economist by profession. After university he worked at the Economic and Social Research Institute. This was followed by two years in the tobacco company P. J. Carroll, before moving on to his final private sector job at CRH.

He is the younger brother of John Bruton, a former Taoiseach and Ambassador of the European Union to the United States.

Bruton is married to Susan Meehan; they have four children, two sons and two daughters.

Early political career: 1979–1992
Bruton was elected to Meath County Council in 1979 and was elected to Seanad Éireann in 1981, as a Senator for the Agricultural Panel. At the February 1982 general election, he was elected to Dáil Éireann as a Fine Gael TD for the Dublin North-Central constituency. After an initial period on the backbenches, Bruton was appointed Minister of State at the Department of Energy, following the resignation of Edward Collins in September 1986. In opposition after 1987, Bruton served in a number of front bench positions including, Energy, Natural Resources, Health, Enterprise and Employment and Director of Policy. He was also the campaign manager for his brother John Bruton's successful party leadership bid in 1990.

Minister for Enterprise and Employment: 1994–1997
Following the 1992 general election, Fianna Fáil and the Labour Party formed a coalition government, which collapsed in 1994. Bruton then helped to negotiate the Rainbow Coalition between Fine Gael, the Labour Party and Democratic Left. In that government, his brother John Bruton became Taoiseach. Bruton was given the highest-ranking Fine Gael ministerial position, serving as Minister for Enterprise and Employment.

Return to Opposition: 1997–2011
A return to opposition in 1997 saw Bruton become Opposition Spokesperson on Education and Science, a position he held until he was appointed Director of Policy and Press Director in a reshuffle in 2000. After losing the 2002 party leadership election to Enda Kenny, Bruton was retained on the front bench and promoted to Deputy Leader as well as Spokesperson on Finance. After an unsuccessful leadership challenge in 2010, he was demoted to Spokesperson on Enterprise, Trade and Innovation.

Dublin City Council: 1999–2003
He was elected to Dublin City Council in 1999, representing the Artane local electoral area. He relinquished this seat when dual mandates were banned in 2003.

Fine Gael leadership election: 2002
Fine Gael had a disastrous election result at the 2002 general election; Bruton was one of the few frontbench Fine Gael TDs to retain his seat. The party lost 23 of its 54 TDs; party leader Michael Noonan soon resigned following the poll. Bruton stood as a candidate in the subsequent leadership election. He was defeated by Enda Kenny, but he was appointed Deputy Leader of Fine Gael and Spokesperson for Finance, posts he maintained until 2010.

Deputy Leader and Spokesperson on Finance: 2002–2010
Bruton was appointed Finance Spokesperson in 2002. In that role he was a consistent critic of government economic policy. In particular, he warned about the government’s overreliance on the property sector, and said that the government was ignoring the erosion of competitiveness and the loss of export market share as a growing construction sector temporarily insulated the economy from their effects.
 
In 2006, he told the Dáil that the government had "doubled its dependence on the construction sector to support its revenue. A total of 25% of every tax euro spent by the government comes from the construction sector. We are not in a strong position; we are, in fact, in a vulnerable position".

Bruton raised concerns about the payment of benchmarking awards. In 2003, on behalf of Fine Gael, he proposed a motion that the payment of the remaining phases of benchmarking be suspended pending implementation of a serious reform package so that the €1.3 Billion cost of benchmarking would be matched by commensurate improvements in public services.

Fine Gael leadership challenge: 2010
On 14 June 2010, Bruton was sacked as Deputy Leader and Spokesperson on Finance, by his leader Enda Kenny, after he informed his colleagues that he would be proposing a leadership challenge against Kenny. Kenny explained that he and Bruton had had a series of discussions in which Bruton said he had lost confidence in him. Kenny later told the media that "Richard's decision leaves me with no option but to relieve him of all his responsibilities". He also said that "some unnamed people have done huge damage to Fine Gael through their anonymous comments to the media which has resulted in an opinion poll dominating the news agenda". He then assigned responsibility for the Finance portfolio to Deputy Kieran O'Donnell.

The first TD to come out in support of Bruton before his sacking was frontbencher Fergus O'Dowd from County Louth. Nine other members of the front bench publicly expressed no confidence in Kenny's leadership. These included Leo Varadkar, Simon Coveney, Brian Hayes and Olivia Mitchell.

On 17 June 2010, a meeting of the parliamentary party was held and the 70 members cast their vote. The outcome was that the parliamentary party voted confidence in Enda Kenny as leader. Bruton then declined to comment as to whether he would serve in Kenny's front bench, despite saying earlier that it would be hypocritical to do so. On 1 July 2010, he was appointed by Kenny as Spokesperson on Enterprise, Trade and Innovation.

Return to Government: 2011–2020

Minister for Jobs, Enterprise and Innovation: 2011–2016
Bruton was appointed by the new Taoiseach Enda Kenny as Minister for Jobs, Enterprise and Innovation on 9 March 2011.

Bruton launched the first annual Action Plan for Jobs in 2012. The Plan's high level target was to create 100,000 net new jobs by 2016. Bruton announced in May 2015, that the target to create 100,000 additional new jobs had been hit almost two years early. The Action Plan is based on setting realistic targets and focusing on them until the measures required are in place. In The Irish Times in early 2014, Stephen Collins wrote approvingly that "hundreds of commitments in the programme are steadily being delivered by Minister for Jobs Richard Bruton" and a year later described the annual plan which is "driven by Minister for Jobs Richard Bruton" as being "one of the outstanding success stories of the Coalition’s term". In an editorial the Irish Independent said that Bruton deserves credit for the manner in which the Action Plan for Jobs has been crafted and implemented across a range of government departments over the last three years. A review of the Action Plan for Jobs by the Organisation for Economic Co-operation and Development (OECD) concluded it had led to two significant developments in Irish public governance. One is a concerted whole of government policy implementation with political backing and oversight at the highest level. The other important development noted by the OECD is the rigorous quarterly monitoring and reporting system modelled on the troika programme.

While campaigning for the government before the European Fiscal Compact referendum on 17 May 2012, Bruton admitted on live radio the possibility of there being a second referendum if the Irish people voted "No".

Minister for Education and Skills: 2016–2018
Following the 2016 general election, there was a delay in government formation. On 9 May 2016, after talks had concluded on forming a new government, Enda Kenny appointed Bruton as Minister for Education and Skills. Bruton launched the first Action Plan for Education in September 2016. The Plan's high level ambition is to make Ireland's education and training system the best in Europe by 2026. Following the election of Leo Varadkar as Taoiseach, Bruton was reappointed as Minister for Education and Skills on 14 June 2017.

Minister for Communications, Climate Action and Environment: 2018–2020
After Minister Denis Naughten's resignation from government due to controversy surrounding the National Broadband Plan, Bruton became Minister for Communications, Climate Action and Environment on 11 October 2018. He was re-elected at the general election in February 2020,  but was not appointed to cabinet in the Government of the 33rd Dáil.

Chairman of the Fine Gael Parliamentary Party
On 22 July 2020, Bruton was elected Chairman of the Fine Gael parliamentary party.

References

External links

Richard Bruton's page on Fine Gael website

 

|-

|-

|-

|-

|-

|-

1953 births
Living people
Alumni of Nuffield College, Oxford
Alumni of University College Dublin
Fine Gael TDs
Local councillors in County Meath
Local councillors in Dublin (city)
Members of the 15th Seanad
Members of the 23rd Dáil
Members of the 24th Dáil
Members of the 25th Dáil
Members of the 26th Dáil
Members of the 27th Dáil
Members of the 28th Dáil
Members of the 29th Dáil
Members of the 30th Dáil
Members of the 31st Dáil
Members of the 32nd Dáil
Members of the 33rd Dáil
Ministers for Education (Ireland)
Ministers of State of the 24th Dáil
People educated at Belvedere College
People educated at Clongowes Wood College
Politicians from County Dublin
Fine Gael senators
Ministers for the Environment (Ireland)
Ministers for Enterprise, Trade and Employment